Enemonzo is a comune (municipality) in the Province of Udine in the Italian region Friuli-Venezia Giulia, located about  northwest of Trieste and about  northwest of Udine.

Enemonzo borders the following municipalities: Preone, Raveo, Socchieve, Verzegnis, Villa Santina.

References

External links
 www.enemonzo.org/

Cities and towns in Friuli-Venezia Giulia